Centro (Spanish for Centre), also known as District 1 and Málaga-Centro, is one of the 11 districts of the city of Málaga, Spain.

It comprises de following wards (barrios):
Barcenillas, Camino del Colmenar, Campos Elíseos, Cañada de los Ingleses, Capuchinos, Centro Histórico, Conde de Ureña, Cristo de la Epidemia, El Bulto, El Ejido, El Molinillo, Ensanche Centro, Explanada de la Estación, La Aurora, La Goleta, La Manía, La Merced, La Trinidad, La Victoria, Lagunillas, Los Antonios, Mármoles, Monte de Gibralfaro, Olletas, Parque Ayala, Perchel Norte, Perchel Sur, Pinares de Olletas, Plaza de Toros Vieja, Polígono Alameda, R.E.N.F.E., San Miguel, Santa Amalia, Segalerva, Seminario, Sierra Blanquilla y Ventaja Alta.

Gallery

References

External links
 Málaga Council official website
 Aerial pictures of Málaga-Centro

Districts of Málaga